Wilton, also known by the previous names of Birmingham Junction, Bismark, and Catoosa, is a town in Shelby County, Alabama, United States. It incorporated in 1918. This town is part of the Birmingham–Hoover–Cullman Combined Statistical Area. At the 2010 census the population was 687, up from 580 in 2000.

History
Wilton was originally known as Birmingham Junction, in reference to when the Southern Railroad was joined here with the Alabama and Tennessee River Railroad. It was next known as Bismark, in honor of Otto von Bismarck. Next, the community was known as Catoosa, in honor of Catoosa County, Georgia. Finally, the town went by Wilton, in honor of Wilton, England.
One structure in Wilton, the Woods-Cleveland-Cooling House, located on the Head-Cleveland farm, is listed on the Alabama Register of Landmarks and Heritage.

Geography
Wilton is located at  (33.081799, -86.879458).

Demographics

As of the census of 2000, there were 580 people, 222 households, and 166 families residing in the town. The racial makeup of the town was 73.28% White, 23.62% Black or African American, 0.86% Native American, 0.17% Asian, and 2.07% from two or more races. 3.28% of the population were Hispanic or Latino of any race.

There were 222 households, out of which 29.7% had children under the age of 18 living with them, 55.0% were married couples living together, 14.4% had a female householder with no husband present, and 24.8% were non-families. 21.6% of all households were made up of individuals, and 7.7% had someone living alone who was 65 years of age or older. The average household size was 2.61 and the average family size was 3.07.

In the town, the population was spread out, with 24.8% under the age of 18, 10.7% from 18 to 24, 31.0% from 25 to 44, 23.3% from 45 to 64, and 10.2% who were 65 years of age or older. The median age was 33 years. For every 100 females, there were 102.8 males. For every 100 females age 18 and over, there were 95.5 males.

The median income for a household in the town was $33,750, and the median income for a family was $40,833. Males had a median income of $30,893 versus $20,500 for females. The per capita income for the town was $15,056. About 9.4% of families and 12.9% of the population were below the poverty line, including 27.5% of those under age 18 and 10.9% of those age 65 or over.

References

Towns in Shelby County, Alabama
Towns in Alabama
Birmingham metropolitan area, Alabama